Udayapurgadhi Rural Municipality is a rural municipality in Udayapur district of Province No. 1 in Nepal. There are 4 rural municipalities in Udayapur district. There are 8 wards in this municipality. According to 2011 census of Nepal, the total population of the municipality is 30,731 and total area is 269.51 km². The headquarter of the municipality is in Panchawati

The rural municipality was established on March 10, 2017 when Ministry of Federal Affairs and Local Development dissolved the existing village development committees and announced the establishment of this new local body.

Panchawati, Bhalayadanda, Tawasri, Dumre and Barre VDCs were merged to form the new rural municipality.

See also
 Sunkoshi Rural Municipality
 Rautamai Rural Municipality
 Tapli Rural Municipality

External links
 udayapurgadhimun.gov.np

References

Populated places in Udayapur District
Rural municipalities in Koshi Province
Rural municipalities in Udayapur district
Rural municipalities of Nepal established in 2017